Sénac is a commune in Hautes-Pyrénées, France. Notable people with the surname Sénac or Senac include:
 Didier Sénac (born 1958), French footballer
 Felix Senac (1815–1866), Confederate States Navy agent
 Gabriel Sénac de Meilhan (1736–1803), French writer
 Guy Sénac (1932–2019), French footballer 
 Jean Sénac (1926–1973), Algerian author
 Jean-Baptiste de Sénac (1693–1770), French physician
 Jean-Charles Sénac (born 1985), French bicycle racer.
 Régis Sénac, French fencer
 Réjane Sénac (born 1975), French political scientist

References

French-language surnames